Meitei may refer to:
Meitei people, of Manipur, India
Meitei language
Meitei script
Meitei architecture
Denechandra Meitei (born 1994), Indian footballer
Loken Meitei (born 1997), Indian footballer
Ningombam Bupenda Meitei (born 1987), Indian writer
Romi Meitei, Indian film director
Waikhom Gojen Meitei, Indian poet and educationist

Language and nationality disambiguation pages